Air Chief Marshal Rakesh Kumar Singh Bhadauria   (born 15 September 1959), is a retired Indian Air Force officer, who served as the Chief of the Air Staff of the Indian Air Force, having assumed office on 30 September 2019 after the retirement of Air Chief Marshal Birender Singh Dhanoa. He retired on 30 September 2021 and was succeeded by Air Chief Marshal Vivek Ram Chaudhari.

Early life and education 
Bhadauria is from Korath, a village of tahsil Bah District Agra. He is born in a Rajput family. His father, Suraj Pal Singh Bhadauria, too served in the Indian Air Force as a Junior Commissioned Officer and retired with the rank of Master Warrant Officer. Bhadauria is an alumnus of Defence Services Command and Staff College Bangladesh, National Defence Academy, Pune and holds a Masters in Defence studies from Command and Staff College.

Career 
Bhadauria was commissioned into the fighter stream of the Indian Air Force on 15 June 1980 with the Sword of Honour. He has clocked over 4,250 hours of flying and has experience on 26 different types of fighter jets and transport aircraft. He held several key operational and administrative appointments at various stages of his service including Commander of a Jaguar Squadron at a front line base in South-Western sector; Commanding Officer of Flight Test Squadron at Aircraft and System Testing Establishment; Chief Test Pilot and Project Director of National Flight Test Centre on the Tejas LCA project; Air Attache in Moscow; Assistant Chief of the Air Staff (Projects); Commandant of the National Defence Academy; Senior Air Staff Officer at Central Air Command and Deputy Chief of the Air Staff (1 January 2016 - 28 February 2017). He is also an experimental Test Pilot, a Category A qualified Flying Instructor and a Pilot Attack Instructor.

Bhadauria served as Air Officer Commanding-in-Chief (AOC-in-C), Southern Air Command from 1 March 2017, succeeding Air Marshal Sunderraman Neelakantan, to 1 August 2018.

He also served as Air Officer Commanding-in-Chief (AOC-in-C), Training Command from 1 August 2018 after retirement of Air Marshal S R K Nair, and held the office till his elevation to the Vice Chief of the Air Staff.

He took office of Vice Chief of the Air Staff on 1 May 2019 after the retirement of Air Marshal Anil Khosla.

On 19 September 2019 he was appointed as the Chief of Air Staff.
He retired on 30 September 2021.

Personal life 
He is married to Asha Bhadauria and they have two children namely Sonali Singh and Sourabh Bhadauria.
His Father is Mr. Suraj Pal Singh Bhadauria, who is also from IAF, and a VSM holder. Hs mother's name is Mrs. Vidhya Vati.

Awards and decorations 
During 41 years of his career, Bhadauria has been awarded several medals: the Ati Vishisht Seva Medal (January 2013), the Vayu Sena Medal (January 2002). and the Param Vishisht Seva Medal (January 2018). He was appointed as the honorary air force ADC to the President of India on 1 January 2019. He was inducted into Mirpur Hall of Fame at Defence Services Command and Staff College, Bangladesh.

Dates of rank

References

Notes

Citations

Living people
Chiefs of Air Staff (India)
Vice Chiefs of Air Staff (India)
Commandants of the National Defence Academy
Recipients of the Param Vishisht Seva Medal
Recipients of the Ati Vishisht Seva Medal
Recipients of the Vayu Sena Medal
National Defence Academy (India) alumni
1959 births
Indian air attachés

pa:ਰਾਕੇਸ਼ ਕੁਮਾਰ ਸਿੰਘ ਭਦੌਰਿਆ